Lowerarchy may refer to:

 A concept in systems theory: Lowerarchy;
 The organization of evil demons in C. S. Lewis' series of stories titles The Screwtape Letters.